Italy was the host nation for the 1960 Summer Olympics in Rome. It was the first time that the nation had hosted the Summer Games, and the second time overall (after the 1956 Winter Olympics in Cortina d'Ampezzo). It also hosted the 1960 Summer Paralympics in Rome – the inaugural Paralympic Games.

280 competitors, 246 men and 34 women, took part in 138 events in 19 sports.

Medals

Gold 

 Livio Berruti – Athletics, 200m, men
 Luigi Arienti, Franco Testa, Mario Vallotto, Marino Vigna – Track Cycling, team pursuit, 4000m, men
 Sante Gaiardoni – Track Cycling, sprint, men
 Sergio Bianchetto, Giuseppe Beghetto – Track Cycling, tandem, 2,000 men
 Sante Gaiardoni – Track Cycling, time trial, 1.000m, men
 Francesco Musso – Boxing, Featherweight (54–57 kg), men
 Giovanni Benvenuti – Boxing, welterweight (63.5 to 67 kg), men
 Francesco De Piccoli – Boxing, Heavyweight (+81 kg), men
 Raimondo D'Inzeo – Equestrian, jumping, individual
 Giuseppe Delfino – Screens, épée, men
 Giuseppe Delfino, Alberto Pellegrino, Carlo Pavesi, Edoardo Mangiarotti, Fiorenzo Marini, Gianluigi Saccaro – Fencing, sword, team, men
 Danio Bardi, Giuseppe D'Altrui, Franco Lavoratori, Gianni Lonzi, Rosario Parmegiani, Eraldo Pizzo, Dante Rossi, Amedeo Ambron, Salvatore Gionta, Luigi Mannelli, Brunello Spinelli, Giancarlo Guerrini – Waterpolo, men
 Antonio Bailetti, Ottavio Cogliati, Giacomo Fornoni, Livio Trapè – Cycling, TTT, men

Silver 
 Primo Zamparini – Boxing, Bantamweight (51–54 kg), men
 Carmelo Bossi – Boxing, half-middleweight (67–71 kg), men
 Alessandro Lopopolo – Boxing, lightweight (57–60 kg), men
 Aldo Dezi, Francesco La Macchia – Canoeing, C-2 1000m, men
 Piero D'Inzeo – Equestrian, jumping, individual
 Tullio Baraglia, Renato Bosatta, Giancarlo Crosta, Giuseppe Galante – Rowing, four-without-mate, men
 Alberto Pellegrino, Luigi Arturo Carpaneda, Mario Curletto, Aldo Aureggi, Edoardo Mangiarotti – Screens, Foil, team, men
 Galliano Rossini – Shooting, stairway, 125 targets, men
 Giovanni Carminucci – Gymnastics, bridge, men
 Livio Trapè – Cycling, road race, men

Bronze 

 Giuseppina Leone – Athletics, 100m, women
 Abdon Pamich – Athletics, 50 km walk, men
 Valentino Gasparella – Track Cycling, sprint, men
 Giulio Saraudi – Boxing, light heavyweight (75–81 kg), men
 Sebastiano Mannironi – Weightlifting, Featherweight (56–60 kg), men
 Raimondo D'Inzeo, Piero D'Inzeo, Antonio Oppes – Equestrian, jumping, team
 Fulvio Balatti, Romano Sgheiz, Franco Trincavelli, Giovanni Zucchi, Ivo Stefanoni – Rowing, four -with-mate
 Bruna Colombetti, Velleda Cesari, Claudia Pasini, Irene Camber, Antonella Ragno-Lonzi – Fencing, Foil, team, women
 Wladimiro Calarese – Fencing, saber, individual, men
 Wladimiro Calarese, Giampaolo Calanchini, Pierluigi Chicca, Roberto Ferrari, Mario Ravagnan – Fencing, saber, team, men
 Giovanni Carminucci, Pasquale Carminucci, Gianfranco Marzolla, Franco Menichelli, Orlando Polmonari, Angelo Vicardi – Gymnastics, men's team
 Franco Menichelli – Gymnastics, floor, men
 Antonio Cosentino, Antonio Ciciliano, Giulio De Stefano – Sailing, Dragon class

Athletics

Results

Basketball

Men's Team Competition
Team Roster
Mario Alesini
Antonio Calebotta
Achille Canna
Alessandro Gamba
Giovanni Gavagnin
Augusto Giomo
Gianfranco Lombardi
Gianfranco Pieri
Alessandro Riminucci
Gianfranco Sardagna
Gabriele Vianello
Paolo Vittori

Boxing

Canoeing

Cycling

14 cyclists, all men, represented Italy in 1960.

Individual road race
 Livio Trapè
 Antonio Bailetti
 Giuseppe Tonucci
 Vendramino Bariviera

Team time trial
 Antonio Bailetti
 Ottavio Cogliati
 Giacomo Fornoni
 Livio Trapè

Sprint
 Sante Gaiardoni
 Valentino Gasparella

1000m time trial
 Sante Gaiardoni

Tandem
 Giuseppe Beghetto
 Sergio Bianchetto

Team pursuit
 Luigi Arienti
 Franco Testa
 Mario Vallotto
 Marino Vigna

Diving

Equestrian

Fencing

20 fencers, 15 men and 5 women, represented Italy in 1960.

Men's foil
 Luigi Carpaneda
 Alberto Pellegrino
 Mario Curletto

Men's team foil
 Edoardo Mangiarotti, Luigi Carpaneda, Alberto Pellegrino, Mario Curletto, Aldo Aureggi

Men's épée
 Giuseppe Delfino
 Giovanni Battista Breda
 Alberto Pellegrino

Men's team épée
 Edoardo Mangiarotti, Giuseppe Delfino, Carlo Pavesi, Alberto Pellegrino, Fiorenzo Marini, Gianluigi Saccaro

Men's sabre
 Wladimiro Calarese
 Roberto Ferrari
 Pierluigi Chicca

Men's team sabre
 Wladimiro Calarese, Giampaolo Calanchini, Pierluigi Chicca, Mario Ravagnan, Roberto Ferrari

Women's foil
 Antonella Ragno-Lonzi
 Irene Camber-Corno
 Bruna Colombetti-Peroncini

Women's team foil
 Antonella Ragno-Lonzi, Irene Camber-Corno, Velleda Cesari, Bruna Colombetti-Peroncini, Claudia Pasini

Football

Men's Team Competition
Team Roster
Luciano Alfieri
Tarcisio Burgnich
Mario Trebbi
Paride Tumburus
Sandro Salvadore
Giovanni Trapattoni
Giancarlo Cella
Giovanni Rivera
Ugo Tomeazzi
Giacomo Bulgarelli
Giorgio Rossano
Orazio Rancati
Giorgio Ferrini
Giovanni Fanello
Gilberto Noletti
Luciano Magistrelli
Giandomenico Baldiserri
Armando Favali
Ambrogio Pelagalli

Gymnastics

Hockey

Modern pentathlon

Three male pentathletes represented Italy in 1960.

Individual
 Adriano Facchini
 Gaetano Scala
 Giulio Giunta

Team
 Adriano Facchini
 Gaetano Scala
 Giulio Giunta

Rowing

Italy had 26 male rowers participate in all seven rowing events in 1960.

 Men's single sculls
 Savino Rebek

 Men's double sculls
 Severino Lucini
 Cesarino Pestuggia

 Men's coxless pair
 Paolo Mosetti
 Mario Petri

 Men's coxed pair
 Giancarlo Piretta
 Renzo Ostino
 Vincenzo Bruno (cox)

 Men's coxless four
 Tullio Baraglia
 Renato Bosatta
 Giancarlo Crosta
 Giuseppe Galante

 Men's coxed four
 Fulvio Balatti
 Romano Sgheiz
 Franco Trincavelli
 Giovanni Zucchi
 Ivo Stefanoni (cox)

 Men's eight
 Paolo Amorini
 Vasco Cantarello
 Gian Carlo Casalini
 Luigi Prato
 Vincenzo Prina
 Nazzareno Simonato
 Luigi Spozio
 Armido Torri
 Giuseppe Pira (cox)

Sailing

Shooting

Nine shooters represented Italy in 1960.

25 m pistol
 Roberto Mazzoni
 Sergio Varetto

50 m pistol
 Piercarlo Beroldi
 Giorgio Ercolani

50 m rifle, three positions
 Vincenzo Biava
 Sergio Rolandi

50 m rifle, prone
 Mariano Antonelli

Trap
 Galliano Rossini
 Edoardo Casciano

Swimming

Men's 4 × 100 m Medley Relay
Giuseppe Avellone, Roberto Lazzari, Federico Dennerlein, and Bruno Bianchi
 Final — 4:17.2 (→ 6th place)

Water polo

Men's Team Competition
Team Roster
Amedeo Ambron
Danio Bardi
Giuseppe d'Altrui
Salvatore Gionta
Giancarlo Guerrini
Franco Lavoratori
Gianni Lonzi
Luigi Mannelli
Rosario Parmegiani
Eraldo Pizzo
Dante Rossi
Brunella Spinelli

Weightlifting

Wrestling

See also
 Italy at the 1960 Summer Paralympics

References

External links
Official Olympic Reports
International Olympic Committee results database
 

Nations at the 1960 Summer Olympics
1960
1960 in Italian sport